"Dard-e-Disco" (Hindi: दर्द-ए-डिस्को) is a hit Indian Hindi song from the 2007 Bollywood musical film, Om Shanti Om. The refrain, Dard-e-Disco (pain of the disco), though essentially meaningless, was modeled after Persian-derived terms traditionally used in song and poetry in the Indian subcontinent such as Dard-e-Dil (pain of the heart) and Dard-e-Muhabbat (pain of love). The song was attacked for being "meaningless", "insane", and "odd", but also called "red-hot", "addictive" and "contagious".

Dard e Disco'''s structure and lyrics are a blend of "old-school" Indian style with an "Arabic flavor". It was sung by Sukhwinder Singh, written by Javed Akhtar, composed by the Vishal–Shekhar duo and picturized on Shah Rukh Khan. The song was reportedly triggered by a conversation in which producer Gulshan Kumar said to choreographer Farah Khan that "only two types of songs sell - dard bhare gaane (songs of sadness) and disco", leading Farah Khan to demand a song that combined the two. Farah Khan later said that initial intent was to picturize the song on Shakira.Dard e Disco rapidly rose in popularity, despite being ridiculed by many critics for including meaningless doggerel, and dominated radio station charts when it initially came out.

Example verse
Each verse in the song ends with the refrain dard-e-disco. In this verse, chhabis ko (on the twenty-sixth) appeared to have been included simply because it rhymes with disco, an example of the approach that was called "audacious''" for how it blatantly put seemingly-random words together into a song.

In Popular Culture 
A parody of this song was featured in the movie Chennai Express.

References

 
 
2007 songs
Sukhwinder Singh songs
Hindi-language songs
Songs with lyrics by Javed Akhtar
Songs with music by Vishal–Shekhar